Rohdendorfia  is a genus of hoverflies.

Species

Rohdendorfia alpina Sack, 1938 
Rohdendorfia dimorpha Smirnov, 1924 
Rohdendorfia montivaga Violovitsh, 1984

References

Diptera of Asia
Hoverfly genera
Syrphinae